Sulaiman Juma Al-Habsi (born 1 February 1970) is an Omani sprinter. He competed in the men's 400 metres at the 1988 Summer Olympics.

References

External links
 

1970 births
Living people
Athletes (track and field) at the 1988 Summer Olympics
Omani male sprinters
Olympic athletes of Oman
Place of birth missing (living people)